The 2010 Judo Grand Prix Tunis was held in Tunis, Tunisia from 7 to 9 May 2010.

Medal summary

Men's events

Women's events

Source Results

Medal table

References

External links
 

2010 IJF World Tour
2010 Judo Grand Prix
Judo
Judo competitions in Tunisia
Judo
Judo